Periya Gounder Ponnu is a 1992 Indian Tamil-language drama film, directed by Manivasagam. The film stars R. Sarathkumar and Gautami, with Manorama, Goundamani, Senthil, Jai Ganesh, Vadivukkarasi, Delhi Ganesh and Vijayaraj in supporting roles. It was released on 28 February 1992.

Plot

Periya Samy, called Periya Gounder by the villagers, is the village chief and a wealthy respected man in his village. His daughter Manjula, an arrogant girl who studied in the city, comes back to her village during summer vacations. Her cousin Thangamuthu is an educated blacksmith and lives with his widow mother, he is the future husband of Manjula as per the village custom. But Periya Samy doesn't want to marry a man from a poor family, so he refuses Thangamuthu and Manjula's marriage.

Periya Samy slowly falls in love with the village belle Jillu and she becomes his secret mistress. He even accepts to marry his daughter with his mistress's rowdy brother. One day, Manjula insults Thangamuthu and his mother. Enraged, he ties a mangala sutra around her neck. What transpires next forms the rest of the story.

Cast

R. Sarathkumar as Thangamuthu
Gautami as Manjula
Manorama as Thangamuthu's mother
Goundamani as Pazhanisamy
Senthil
Jai Ganesh as Periya Samy (Periya Gounder)
Vadivukkarasi as Deivatha
Delhi Ganesh as Thangamuthu's father
Vijayaraj
Pasi Narayanan
Jillu as Jillu
Thideer Kannaiah
Sharmili as Kanthamani
Karuppu Subbiah
Senji Krishnan
Chandrika
Umasri

Soundtrack

The music was composed by Deva, with lyrics written by Kalidasan.

Reception
NKS of The Indian Express wrote, "Such a skewed scenario notwithstanding, director Manivasagam keeps the drama going because of good performances [..]." C. R. K. of Kalki also gave the same comments on his review.

References

External links 

1990s Tamil-language films
1992 drama films
1992 films
Films directed by Manivasagam
Films scored by Deva (composer)
Indian drama films